Vaduvoor Bird Sanctuary is a 128.10-hectare area located in Vaduvoor lake, Mannargudi Taluk, Thiruvarur District, Tamil Nadu, India. The sanctuary is about 25 kilometers from Thanjavur and 14 kilometers from Mannargudi on the Thanjavur-Kodiakkarai State Highway 63. It was created in the year 1999. The irrigation tank receives water from November to April every year which attracts numerous foreign birds from Europe and America. The sanctuary attracts more than 40 species of water birds like the white ibis, painted stork, grey pelican, pintails, cormorants, teals, herons, spoonbills, darters, coots, Open bill storks, and pheasant–tailed jacana. The sanctuary is a favorite spot for the migratory birds and during the months of November and December more than 20000 winged visitors reach this area. The sanctuary has basic facilities for tourists to stay overnight and enjoy watching the birds from the two watch towers.

Bird migration is a seasonal phenomenon and when the temperature escalates in Europe and in the North America, the birds move to more favourable climes. The wetlands in this region is quite suitable for the migratory birds as it provides suitable environment for food, shelter and reproduction. The farmers of this region also love the arrival of migratory birds as the irrigation water becomes fertile once it was enriched with the excretory of the birds. The state government had appointed officers for prevention of both hunting and poaching. Poaching and hunting is illegal and it is a punishable offence. The villagers were aware of this and a friendly environment for the shelter of the birds prevails. The small town is a good agricultural land and rice is grown in plenty.

History 

The Vaduvoor Birds Sanctuary was created in 1999. The sanctuary has been designated as a protected Ramsar site since 2022.

Bird species 
The Vaduvoor Bird Sanctuary attracts more than 40 species of water birds like the white ibis, painted Stork, grey pelican, pintails, cormorants, teals, herons, spoonbills, darters, coots, open bill storks, and pheasant tailed jacana. The sanctuary is a favorite spot for the migratory birds during the months of November and December. More than 2000 winged visitors reach this area.

Location 

The Vaduvoor Bird sanctuary is located in the Vaduvoor Lake which is 25 km from Thanjavur and 14 km from Mannargudi on the Thanjavur-Kodiakkarai State Highway 63.

Climate

Transport 

	By Road
Buses are available 24x7 from both Thanjavur and Mannargudi.

	By Train 
Nearest railway station is Thanjavur Junction railway station and Mannargudi railway station.

	By Air 
The nearest International Airport from Vaduvoor is Tiruchirapalli International Airport, Tamil Nadu, roughly two hours drive from Vaduvoor (85 Km). It is well connected to a spectrum of cities in India and abroad such as Bangalore, Chennai, Singapore, and Malaysia etc.

Nearby Places 
 Kothandaramaswamy temple, Vaduvur
 Brihadisvara Temple, Thanjavur
 Rajagopalaswamy Temple, Mannargudi
 Muthupet mangroves and lagoon

See also 
List of birds of South India
List of birds of Tamil Nadu
Bird sanctuaries of Tamil Nadu
List of wildlife sanctuaries of India

References 

 
 
 
 

Tiruvarur district
Bird sanctuaries of Tamil Nadu
1999 establishments in Tamil Nadu
Protected areas established in 1999
Ramsar sites in India